Dichorda is a genus of moths in the family Geometridae.

Species
 Dichorda iris (Butler, 1881)
 Dichorda obliquata Warren, 1904
 Dichorda porphyropis Prout, 1925
 Dichorda consequaria (H. Edwards, 1884)
 Dichorda illustraria (Hulst, 1886)
 Dichorda iridaria (Guenée, 1857)
 Dichorda rectaria (Grote, 1877)
 Dichorda rhodocephala Prout, 1916
 Dichorda uniformis Warren, 1909

References
 
 
 

Geometrinae